The 2007 World Sambo Championships was held in Prague, Czech Republic from 7 to 11 November 2007.
This tournament hosted competition in Combat Sambo, and Sport Sambo events.

Categories 
Combat Sambo: 52 kg, 57 kg, 62 kg, 68 kg, 74 kg, 82 kg, 90 kg, 100 kg, +100 kg
Men's: 52 kg, 57 kg, 62 kg, 68 kg, 74 kg, 82 kg, 90 kg, 100 kg, +100 kg
Women's: 48 kg, 52 kg, 56 kg, 60 kg, 64 kg, 72 kg, 80 kg, +80 kg

Medal overview

Combat Sambo events

Men's Sambo events

Women's Sambo events

Medal table

External links 
 

World Sambo Championships
World Sambo Championships, 2007
Sports competitions in Prague
2007 in sambo (martial art)
World Sambo Championships, 2007
World Sambo Championships